Otabek Karimov (born 4 January 1998) is a Tajikistani professional football player who currently plays for Kuktosh Rudaki.

Career

International
Saidov made his senior team debut on 11 June 2019 against China.

Career statistics

International

Statistics accurate as of match played 15 July 2019

References

1998 births
Living people
Tajikistani footballers
Tajikistan international footballers
Association football midfielders